Camas Creek is a  long river in southern Idaho, United States, that is a tributary of the Big Wood River.

Description
Camas Creek has a  watershed.

See also

 List of rivers of Idaho
 List of longest streams of Idaho

Notes

References

External links

Rivers of Camas County, Idaho
Rivers of Elmore County, Idaho
Rivers of Blaine County, Idaho
Rivers of Idaho